is a Japanese singer, actress, television presenter, and radio personality. She is a member of the girl group Hinatazaka46.

Early life 
Matsuda trained in classical ballet from the age of three until she joined Hiragana Keyakizaka46. She was also a member of the taiko club and started playing the guitar in a band in high school.

Career

On August 13, 2017, Matsuda joined Hiragana Keyakizaka46, now Hinatazaka46, and entered the group as a second generation member. Before joining the group, she was a fan who attended Nogizaka46 and Keyakizaka46 handshake events. Her catchphrases include  and "Yahhossu~". She is one half of the guitar duo subgroup Hana-chans with Suzuka Tomita, and have released their first song as part of Hinatazaka46's third single.

Matsuda was a co-host for the TBS Television morning show Love It! from August to September 2021. She was also appointed support ambassador for DAZN's AFC Asian Cup qualifications "Road to Qatar" campaign which ran from August 2021 to March 2022, along with fellow Hinatazaka46 members Mei Higashimura and Yūka Kageyama. In October 2021, Matsuda started her first solo radio program,  on Nippon Broadcasting System, which regular listeners are called . In October 2022, she was appointed regular co-host for The Time, another TBS morning show.

Personal life 
Matsuda has an older sister. She grows a Monstera named  and a Sansevieria trifasciata named . She holds a Kanji Kentei level 2 certification.

Discography

Hiragana Keyakizaka46

Singles

Albums 
The songs listed below are not included in any singles above.

Hinatazaka46

Singles

Albums 
The songs listed below are not included in any singles above.

Unreleased music

Videography

Video albums

Filmography

Theatre

Television

Dramas

Talk shows

Other TV shows

Radio

Events

Attraction

Notes

References

External links
  
  (December 8, 2017 - ) 
  on Showroom 

1999 births
Living people
Actresses from Kyoto Prefecture
21st-century Japanese actresses
Hinatazaka46 members
Japanese idols
Musicians from Kyoto Prefecture